Rainer Polak is an ethnomusicologist and djembe drummer who has researched in the field of West African celebration music performances and written in the field of ethnomusicology.

Biography 

Rainer Polak studied social anthropology, African linguistics, Bambara language, and History of Africa from 1989 to 1996 at Bayreuth University (Germany), and jenbe music performance from 1991 until today in Bamako (Mali). All of his studies and work in Bamako were accomplished with the help of locally and traditionally minded drummers whose playing is presented in his book and the corresponding CD.

Polak worked as a professional jenbe player in Bamako for one year in 1997/98, performing at well over a hundred traditional weddings, spirit possession dances and other celebrations on the basis of being hired by the late Jaraba Jakite, most of the times, and occasionally by the late Yamadu Bani Dunbia, by Jeli Madi Kuyate, and by Drissa Kone. The ethnomusicological dissertation and book he wrote on that experience won the academic prize of the German African Studies Association in 2003/04. Polak ranks as an outstanding jenbe soloist in Germany. As a teacher he has specialized in giving focused classes on micro-timing, and master-classes in jenbe solo performance.

Publications 
 (in Vorbereitung): West African Percussion. One World–Many Musics, vol. 6 (DVD). Rotterdam: Codarts / Hogeschool voor de Kunsten.
 2004 Festmusik als Arbeit, Trommeln als Beruf. Jenbe-Spieler in einer westafrikanischen Großstadt. Berlin: Reimer.
 2007 »Performing Audience: On the Social Constitution of Focused Interaction at Celebrations in Mali«. In: Anthropos 102.2007/1: 3–18.
 2005 »A Musical Instrument Travels Around the World: Jenbe Playing in Bamako, in West Africa, and Beyond«. In: Post, Jennifer (ed.), Ethnomusicology: A Contemporary Reader. NY: Routledge Press, 161–185. [Erstveröff. 2000 in The World of Music]
 2005 »Drumming for Money and Respect. The Commercialization of Traditional Celebration Music in Bamako«. In: Jansen, Jan and Stephen Wooten (eds.), Wari Matters: Ethnographic Explorations of money in the Mande World. LIT Verlag, pp. 135–161.
 2004 »Die Kommerzialisierung der Hochzeitsfestmusik in Bamako«. In: Beck, Kurt, Till Förster und Hans Peter Hahn (Hrsg.), Blick nach vorn. Festgabe für Gerd Spittler zum 65. Geburtstag. Köln: Köppe, S. 235–249.
 2003 »City rhythms: The urbanization of local drum/dance celebration music in Bamako«. In:Jansen, Jan (ed.), Experts in Mandé. Leiden: Nederlandse Vereniging van Afrika Studies, pp. 1–24.
 2001 »Festmusik: Zur Ethnographie musikalischer Gattungen in Westafrika«. In: Marianne Bröcker(Hrsg.), Berichte aus dem ICTM-Nationalkomitee Deutschland IX/X. Bamberg: Universitätsbibliothek, S. 19–50.
 2000 »A Musical Instrument Travels Around the World: Jenbe Playing in Bamako, in West Africa, and Beyond«. In: The World of Music 42/3: 7–46.
 2000 »Ein Musikinstrument geht um die Welt. Zur Verflechtung lokaler, nationaler und internationaler Kontexte im Bamakoer Jenbe-Spiel«. In: Bauer, Ulrich, Henrik Egbert und Frauke Jäger (Hrsg.), Interkulturelle Beziehungen und Kulturwandel in Afrika. Beiträge zur Globalisierungsdebatte. Frankfurt a. M.: Peter Lang Verlag, S. 291–312.
 1998 »Jenbe Music in Bamako: Microtiming as Formal Model and Performance Practice«. In: Iwalewa-Forum 2: 24–46.
 1997 »Bewegung, Zeit und Pulsation. Theorierelevante Aspekte der Jenbemusik in Bamako«. In: Jahrbuch für musikalische Volks- und Völkerkunde 16: 59–70.
 1999 »Andreas Meyer: Afrikanische Trommeln«. In: The World of Music 41/1.
 1999 »Gilbert Rouget: Guinée. Musique Malinké«. In: The World of Music 41/2.
 1999 »Thomas Hale: Griots and Griottes«. In: The World of Music 41/3.

References

External links 
 MANDING BIBLIOGRAPHY Compiled by Rainer Polak
 Jenbe Music: Microtiming Article about Microtiming

Living people
Djembe players
Ethnomusicologists
Year of birth missing (living people)
University of Bayreuth alumni